Dr Praveen Gedam is an Indian bureaucrat. He is a 2002 batch Indian Administrative Service officer of Maharashtra cadre.

Dr Gedam served as Additional CEO of the National Health Authority. He has been in charge of policy formulation, design, and implementation of flagship health care schemes of the Government of India (AB PM-JAY and ABDM).  Ayushman Bharat Pradhan Mantri Jan Arogya Yojana–AB PMJAY is the world's largest government health insurance scheme, providing health cover to 540 million Indians. He is the first Mission Director of the Ayushman Bharat Digital Mission (ABDM) of India, which aims to revolutionize healthcare services for all citizens through digital highways.

Early life and education 
He completed MBBS from Government Medical College, Nagpur.

Career

Govt of Maharashtra 
Dr Praveen Gedam joined the Indian Administrative Service in 2002 (Maharashtra cadre). He has held several important positions in his career and has earlier served the Government of Maharashtra in various capacities. He has served as Municipal Commissioner in Nashik and Jalgoan and District Collector in Solapur and Osmanabad. He has also held the positions of CEO of Zila Parishad, Latur and Director of the Groundwater Surveys and Development Agency.

In 2016, he was appointed as the Transport Commissioner, Nashik in the Government of Maharashtra where he spearheaded a massive computerization exercise and sought to reduce scams in consumer access to services at the Regional Transport Office.

Govt of India 
In 2017, he was appointed as the Private Secretary to Hon'ble Union Cabinet Minister of Railways in the Government of India.

In 2019, he joined National Health Authority as Deputy CEO. Subsequently, he assumed office as Additional CEO, National Health Authority and Mission Director, ABDM. He has been responsible for policy formulation, design, and implementation of Ayushman Bharat Pradhan Mantri Jan Arogya Yojana (AB PM-JAY) and steering Ayushman Bharat Digital Mission (ABDM), a flagship programme of Govt of India to establish an integrated digital health ecosystem in India.

Notable Work 
While serving as Municipal Commissioner of Jalgaon, he discovered and exposed the Jalgaon housing scam, sometimes called the Jalgaon Gharkul scam (Marathi: जळगाव घरकुल घोटाळा) and filed a police complaint against Khandesh Builders and others with respect to the irregularities he saw after that company was awarded the housing contract.  The financial scam involved illicit diverting of approximately ₹110 crore in loaned public municipal funds, that were earmarked for a 1996-initiated project for the building of over 11,000 units of subsidized housing to benefit the area's rural poor population, and to reduce the prevalence of slums. The incident is considered the largest known scam in the history of North Maharashtra.

He is known for the turnaround in Maternal and Child Health indicators in Latur, one of the most backward districts of the state, due to targeted interventions, systematic medical check-ups and massive community mobilization exercises.

While serving as District Collector at Osmanabad, he not only plugged the loot at Tuljabhavani temple at Tuljapur but also helped the temple obtain an ISO certificate in the clean-up process. After he sensed that donations were pilfered on a massive scale, Dr Gedam used multiple direct and indirect methods at the famous temple, which led to astounding results. The income of the temple, which was hovering around Rs7 crore a year, some five to seven kgs of gold and 40-45 kg of silver, jumped four times to Rs 24 crore, excluding gold and silver donations. He also improved physical amenities including a modern darshan mandap, built three modern bhakt niwas (lodging) using traditional designs, developed gardens and improved roads.

As Director, GSDA, he implemented the Solar Dual Pump Water Supply Scheme. It helped provide round-the year tap water pumped without the use of electricity in 10,000 villages in 82 Naxal affected districts of Andhra Pradesh, Jharkhand, Bihar, Chhattisgarh, Odisha, Uttar Pradesh and West Bengal.

As District Collector of Solapur, Maharashtra, he devised a strategy and came up with Sand Mining Approval and Tracking system (SMAT) to curb illegal sand mining. The system has been adopted across India as the National Sustainable Sand Mining Guidelines.

In 2015, he was entrusted with organizing and managing the mega-event of Kumbh Mela in Nashik. which is one of the largest human congregations on earth – which had the distinction of having zero missing, zero casualties, zero outbreaks.

Ayushman Bharat 
He has spoken for the NHA's response to the COVID-19 pandemic in India in advocacy of farmer's access to healthcare,  enabling access to driving insurance for ridesharing company workers and for developing digital health services throughout India.

References

External links
Dr. Praveen Gedam Deputy Chief Executive Officer (NHA) speaks to India News on Fight against COVID19
IAS Praveen Gedam discussing Public Participation in Administration

Indian Administrative Service officers
Year of birth missing (living people)
Living people